Nik Pem (born 30 August 1995) is a Slovenian ice hockey forward who currently plays for HDD Jesenice and the Slovenian national team.

He participated at the 2017 IIHF World Championship.

References

External links

1995 births
Living people
Slovenian ice hockey forwards
Sportspeople from Jesenice, Jesenice
Slovenian expatriate ice hockey people
Slovenian expatriate sportspeople in Germany
Heilbronner Falken players
HK Acroni Jesenice players
HDD Olimpija Ljubljana players
Expatriate ice hockey players in Germany